Stanley Macomber (November 26, 1887 – May 15, 1967) designed and patented the open web joist floor system, and founded the Massillon Steel Joist Company of Massillon, Ohio, and the Macomber Steel Company of Canton, Ohio.

Macomber was inducted into the National Inventors Hall of Fame in 2011.

References 

1887 births
1967 deaths
20th-century American inventors